François Dezoteux (born 1724 in Boulogne-sur-Mer; died 1803 in Versailles) was a French doctor and surgeon.

Biography 
He took part as a military surgeon in the War of the Austrian Succession. In 1760 he became surgeon-major of the king's regiment. Appointed in Besançon, he managed to rehabilitate the vaccination of smallpox then lived for some time in England where he studied a new process, the Suttonian inoculation, which he experimented on his return to France.

He had Louis XVI establish the school of military surgery in Paris, of which he was appointed head, and was promoted to inspector of military hospitals in 1789, a position he lost during the French Revolution.

Bibliography 

 Dezobry and Bachelet, Dictionary of biography , t. 1, Ch.Delagrave, 1876, p.  791

References 

1803 deaths
People from Boulogne-sur-Mer
1724 births
18th-century French physicians